Papal jurisdiction may refer to:

 Papal supremacy, the ecclesiastical jurisdiction of the pope
 Temporal power of the Holy See, the political jurisdiction of the pope